Caledonia Township is a civil township of Alcona County in the U.S. state of Michigan. The population was 1,161 at the 2010 census.

Communities
It should not be confused with another nearby community named Hubbard Lake just to the north in Alpena County. The CDP also extends into Alcona Township and Hawes Township.
The community began with the construction of a sawmill by Don Hecox, who also became the first postmaster when the rural post office opened on May 5, 1898. The Spruce post office remains open and uses the 48762 ZIP Code, which serves the eastern portion of Caledonia Township and smaller portions of several neighboring township.

Geography

The northern section of Hubbard Lake is within Caledonia Township.

Major highways
 runs briefly through the northeast corner of the township.
 is a county-designated highway that has its northern terminus as U.S. Route 23 within the township.

Demographics

As of the census of 2000, there were 1,203 people, 535 households, and 379 families residing in the township.  The population density was 17.8 per square mile (6.9/km2).  There were 1,074 housing units at an average density of 15.9 per square mile (6.2/km2).  The racial makeup of the township was 99.00% White, 0.25% Native American, 0.17% Asian, and 0.58% from two or more races. Hispanic or Latino of any race were 0.42% of the population.

There were 535 households, out of which 18.1% had children under the age of 18 living with them, 61.9% were married couples living together, 5.4% had a female householder with no husband present, and 29.0% were non-families. 24.1% of all households were made up of individuals, and 12.9% had someone living alone who was 65 years of age or older.  The average household size was 2.25 and the average family size was 2.64.

In the township the population was spread out, with 16.8% under the age of 18, 5.3% from 18 to 24, 20.9% from 25 to 44, 32.3% from 45 to 64, and 24.8% who were 65 years of age or older.  The median age was 50 years. For every 100 females, there were 104.6 males.  For every 100 females age 18 and over, there were 105.1 males.

The median income for a household in the township was $36,000, and the median income for a family was $38,625. Males had a median income of $29,539 versus $21,964 for females. The per capita income for the township was $19,051.  About 9.6% of families and 13.6% of the population were below the poverty line, including 18.7% of those under age 18 and 11.2% of those age 65 or over.

Education
Caledonia Township is served entirely by Alcona Community Schools.

References

External links

 Caledonia Township official website

Townships in Alcona County, Michigan
Townships in Michigan
Populated places established in 1868
1868 establishments in Michigan